Hugh Fisher,  (born October 1, 1955) is a New Zealand-born Canadian sprint kayaker who competed from the mid-1970s to the late 1980s. He participated in three Summer Olympics: in 1976 in Montreal, Quebec, Canada; in 1984 in Los Angeles; and in 1988 in Seoul, Korea. He was also named to the 1980 Olympic team for Canada, but did not compete due to the Canadian boycott of those Games. At the 1984 Games with his racing partner Alwyn Morris, he won two medals, a gold in the K-2 1000 m and a bronze in the K-2 500 m events.

Fisher and Morris also won medals at the ICF Canoe Sprint World Championships with a silver in the K-2 1000 m in 1982 and a bronze in the K-2 500 m in 1983.

In 1985, he was awarded the Order of Canada for his athletic achievements. In 1985 he was also inducted into the British Columbia Sports Hall of Fame, and as of 2020 is the only sprint canoe or kayak athlete so honoured. He was inducted into the Canadian Olympic Hall of Fame in 1986, and to Canada's Sports Hall of Fame in 2000.

Fisher is currently a medical doctor in the town of Whistler, British Columbia.

References

Hugh Fisher at The Canadian Encyclopedia

Northlands Medical Clinic physician profile featuring Fisher.

1955 births
Sportspeople from British Columbia
Canadian male canoeists
New Zealand emigrants to Canada
Physicians from British Columbia
Canoeists at the 1976 Summer Olympics
Canoeists at the 1984 Summer Olympics
Canoeists at the 1988 Summer Olympics
Living people
Members of the Order of Canada
New Zealand male canoeists
Olympic canoeists of Canada
Olympic gold medalists for Canada
Olympic bronze medalists for Canada
Olympic medalists in canoeing
ICF Canoe Sprint World Championships medalists in kayak
Medalists at the 1984 Summer Olympics